The tenth cycle of Holland's Next Top Model premiered on 4 September 2017 on RTL5. Anouk Smulders was replaced by cycle 9 judge Anna Nooshin as the show's new host. Judges Alek Bruessing and Fred van Leer did not return for the new cycle. The new panel of judges was composed of cycle 2 winner Kim Feenstra, photographer Nigel Barker and stylist JeanPaul Paula.

The prizes for this cycle included a modelling contract with VDM Model Management, a fashion spread in Elle magazine, and a campaign for HEMA.

The winner of the competition was 19 year-old Montell van Leijen from Deventer.

Format changes
This cycle introduced the participation of male contestants. Application was restricted exclusively to female contestants in prior cycles of the show. The show also saw the return of linear call-outs at elimination. The last cycle to follow the format was cycle 5 in 2011.

Cast

Contestants
(Ages stated are at start of contest)

Judges
  (host)
 Nigel Barker
 Kim Feenstra
 JeanPaul Paula

Episodes

Results

 The contestant was eliminated
 The contestant was eliminated outside of judging panel
 The contestant advanced to the final
 The contestants were collectively put through to the next round
 The contestant won the competition

Notes

References

External links
Official website
 

Holland's Next Top Model
2017 Dutch television seasons